The 1992 Davis Cup World Group Qualifying Round was held from 25 to 27 September. They were the main play-offs of the 1992 Davis Cup. The winners of the playoffs advanced to the 1993 Davis Cup World Group, and the losers were relegated to their respective Zonal Regions I.

In response to the Yugoslav Wars and following the adoption of United Nations Security Council Resolution 757 in May 1992, Yugoslavia was barred from competing in international sporting competition. This resulted in the Yugoslav team being disqualified from this and future Davis Cups, and their Qualifying Round tie against Cuba was defaulted. Cuba therefore qualified for the 1993 Davis Cup World Group.

Teams
Bold indicates team had qualified for the 1993 Davis Cup World Group.

From World Group

 
 
 
 
 
 
 
 

 From Americas Group I

 
 

 From Asia/Oceania Group I

 
 

 From Europe/Africa Group I

Results summary
Date: 25–27 September

The eight losing teams in the World Group first round ties and eight winners of the Zonal Group I final round ties competed in the World Group Qualifying Round for spots in the 1993 World Group.

 ,  and  remain in the World Group in 1993.
 ,  and  remain in Zonal Group I in 1993.

Qualifying results

Denmark vs. Argentina

Canada vs. Austria

Germany vs. Belgium

Spain vs. Israel

India vs. Great Britain

CIS vs. South Korea

Netherlands vs. Uruguay

References

External links
Davis Cup Official Website

World Group Qualifying Round